Moses is a British documentary programme about the prophet Moses, incorporating scientific and contemporary historical evidence.

It was first broadcast in the United Kingdom at 8 p.m. on 1 December 2002, and was produced and joint-sponsored by the BBC and TLC in association with Jerusalem Productions.

Moses was commissioned by the BBC in July 2001 following the success of a similar series, Son of God, which had been broadcast three months earlier—it documented the life of Moses is a style similar to that which Son of God had previously done for Jesus Christ. It was presented by Jeremy Bowen, a former Middle East correspondent for BBC News, and was directed by Jean-Claude Bragard. Moses featured live-action reenactments, computer-generated images of the period and interviews with historians and scholars.

References

External links

BBC television documentaries
English-language television shows
2002 British television series debuts
2002 British television series endings